Good Morning Mr Doubleday is a black and white 1969 Australian TV series which ran for 26 episodes. It is a sitcom set in a high school.

References

External links
Good Morning Mr Doubleday at AustLit
Good Morning Mr Doubleday at Classic Australian TV
Good Morning Mr Doubleday at IMDb
Good Morning Mr Doubleday at National Film and Sound Archive

Australian television sitcoms